Eleven Hundred Springs is a country music band from Dallas, Texas.

History
Eleven Hundred Springs was founded by Matt Hillyer (lead vocalist, guitar, primary songwriter), Steven Berg (bass), and Richie Vasquez (drums) in 1998. Prior to forming Eleven Hundred Springs, Matt and Steven had played together in three previous bands, most notably the Dallas rockabilly band Lone Star Trio. The band's early days included a lengthy Monday night residency at Adair's in Deep Ellum. It was during this time that the band's first album, Welcome to Eleven Hundred Springs, was recorded, as well as Live at Adair's.

Over the years, the band has had several lineup changes, with key band member Jordan Hendrix joining the group in 2006.

The most recent, and what proved to be the band's final lineup was put together in October 2016.

On June 9, 2021, lead singer/songwriter Matt Hillyer announced via his Facebook page that, “with bittersweet feelings that we've decided to bring the band to an end.”

On Friday November 26, 2021, the band played its final farewell show at the Granada Theater in Dallas, Texas.

Band members
Matt  Hillyer - Lead guitar, lead vocals
Steven Berg - Upright and electric bass, backing vocals
Jordan Hendrix- Fiddle
Chad Rueffer- Lead guitar, backing vocals, some lead vocals
Ray Austin- Steel Guitar, dobro
Christian Dorn- Percussion

Former band members
Drums - Richie Vasquez, Bruce Alford, Mark Reznicek (currently with The Toadies), Brian Ferguson, Arjuna Contreras
Guitar - Chris Claridy (currently with Cody Jinks)
Fiddle - Jason Garner
Steel guitar - Aaron Wynne, Danny Crelin, Burton Lee

Albums
 Here 'Tis (State Fair Records, 2020)
 The Finer Things in Life (Eleven Hundred Springs, 2018)
 Midway (Eleven Hundred Springs, 2012) 
 Eight the Hard Way (Smith Music, 2011)
 This Crazy Life (Smith Music, 2010)
 Country Jam (Palo Duro Records, 2008)
 Bandwagon (Palo Duro Records, 2004)
 Texas Unplugged, Vol 1 (Palo Duro Records, 2004)
 Broken Dreams, EP (Last Beat Records, 2003)
 Waylon Jennings, The Red River Tribute Compilation (Omaha, 2003)
 Straighter Line (13 Recordings, 2001)
 No Stranger to the Blues (13 Recordings, 2000)
 Live at Adair's Saloon (13 Recordings, 1999)
 Welcome to Eleven Hundred Springs (13 Recordings, 1998)

See also
 Outlaw country
 Alternative country
 Rockabilly
 Red Dirt

External links
 

Eleven Hundred Springs
Musicians from Dallas